Jit is a Palestinian town in the northern West Bank, located 10 kilometers (6.2 mi) west of Nablus.  According to the Palestinian Central Bureau of Statistics, the village had a population of approximately 2,320 inhabitants in 2006.

Location
It is bordered by Sarra and Beit Iba to the east, Fara'ata and Immatain to the south, Kafr Qaddum to the west, and Qusin to the north.

History
No Byzantine remains have been found here, leading scholars to suggest that the early Muslim inhabitants came there as a result of migration, and not conversion. However, in 2011 two reliefs of menorahs dating from the Byzantine period, probably of Samaritan origin, were discovered in Jit. 

Diya al-Din (1173-1245) refers to the presence of Muslims in Jit during his lifetime, and that followers of Ibn Qudamah lived here.

Ottoman era
In 1517, the village was included in the Ottoman empire with the rest of Palestine, and in the 1596 tax-records it appeared as Jit Jammal, located in the Nahiya of Jabal Qubal of the Liwa of Nablus. The population was 50 households, all Muslim. They paid a  fixed tax rate of 33.3% on agricultural products, such as  wheat, barley, summer crops, olive trees, goats and beehives, a press for olive oil or grape syrup, in addition to occasional revenues and a fixed tax for people of Nablus area; a total of 20,000 akçe.

A map from Napoleon's invasion of 1799 by Pierre Jacotin named it Qarihagi, (Quryet Jitt) as a village by the road from Jaffa to Nablus.

In 1838, Kuryet Jit was noted as a village located in the District of Jurat 'Amra, south of Nablus.

In 1870, Victor Guérin noted between seven hundred and fifty and eight hundred people in the village. Also, "here Guérin observed among the houses a certain number of cut stones of apparent
antiquity. Many of the houses are in a ruinous condition, others are completely destroyed. On the north-west side of the hill he found a great well, into which one descends by fifteen steps, now fallen to pieces. It gives a supply of water which never fails. The place is probably the old Gitta mentioned by Justin Martyr and Eusebius as the birthplace of Simon the Magician." 

In 1882, the PEF's Survey of Western Palestine (SWP) described Kuryet Jit as: "A well-built stone village with a high house in it, standing on a knoll by the main road, surrounded with olives; it has a well to the west; the inhabitants are remarkable for their courtesy, this part of the country and all the district west of it being little visited by tourists."

British Mandate era
In the 1922 census of Palestine conducted by the British Mandate authorities, Qariyet Jit had a population of 285 Muslims, increasing in the 1931 census to 289 Muslims, in 70 houses.

In the 1945 statistics the population of Jit was 440 (all Muslim), while the total land area was 6,461 dunams, according to an official land and population survey. Of this, 816 were allocated for plantations and irrigable land, 3,915 for cereals, while 61 dunams were classified as built-up (urban) areas.

Jordanian era
In the wake of the 1948 Arab–Israeli War, and after the 1949 Armistice Agreements, Jit came under Jordanian rule. It was annexed by Jordan in 1950.

The Jordanian census of 1961 found 660 inhabitants.

Post 1967
Since the Six-Day War in 1967, Jit has been under Israeli occupation. 

After the 1995 accords, 14% of village land was classified as Area B, the remaining 86% as Area C. Israel has confiscated village land for the Israeli settlements of Giv'at HaMerkaziz and Mitzpe Yishai, both part of the Kedumim settlement. According to the Israeli plans of 2013, 1,150 dunums (18.1% of the village’s total area) will be isolated from the village behind the Israeli barrier wall.

Reports have been made about Israeli settlers from Kedumim stealing the olive harvest from the farmers of Jit.

Footnotes

Bibliography

External links
Welcome to Jit
Survey of Western Palestine, Map 11:    IAA, Wikimedia commons
  Jit village (fact sheet), Applied Research Institute–Jerusalem (ARIJ)
Jit village profile, ARIJ
 Jit, aerial photo, ARIJ
 Development Priorities and Needs in Jit, ARIJ

Qalqilya Governorate
Jit
Municipalities of the State of Palestine
Ancient Samaritan settlements